The National Board of Review Award for Breakthrough Performance is one of the annual film awards given by the National Board of Review of Motion Pictures since 1995.

Winners

1990s

2000s

2010s

2020s

Notes

References

External links
 Breakthrough Performance Archives at National Board of Review
 Breakthrough Performance Actor Archives at National Board of Review
 Breakthrough Performance Actress Archives at National Board of Review

National Board of Review Awards
Awards for young actors
Awards established in 1995
1995 establishments in the United States